Marvin Knoll (born 5 February 1990) is a German professional footballer who plays as a midfielder for MSV Duisburg.

Career
Knoll made his professional debut for Hertha BSC's first team in German second division on 5 December 2010, following injuries to Raffael and Fanol Perdedaj, coming on as a substitute for fellow debutant Alfredo Morales. At the beginning of the 2011–12 season he was loaned for one year to Dynamo Dresden.

In July 2013, after being released by Hertha BSC, he moved to SV Sandhausen.

He joined SSV Jahn Regensburg on a free transfer in January 2015.

In May 2018, FC St. Pauli announced Knoll would join the club for the 2018–19 season. The transfer fee paid to Regensburg was undisclosed. After three years at St. Pauli, he left them and moved to MSV Duisburg in January 2022.

Career statistics

References

External links

1990 births
Living people
Association football midfielders
Footballers from Berlin
German footballers
Germany youth international footballers
Hertha BSC players
Hertha BSC II players
Dynamo Dresden players
SV Sandhausen players
SSV Jahn Regensburg players
SSV Jahn Regensburg II players
FC St. Pauli players
MSV Duisburg players
2. Bundesliga players
3. Liga players
Regionalliga players
Oberliga (football) players
SC Staaken players